Summer Lightning is a 1933 British comedy film directed by Maclean Rogers and starring Ralph Lynn, Winifred Shotter, Chili Bouchier and Horace Hodges. It is based on the 1929 novel Summer Lightning by P.G. Wodehouse.

Premise
Hugo Carmody, the impoverished secretary to Lord Emsworth falls for Millicent the boss's niece, and steals his Lordship's prize pig in a scheme to raise funds to marry her.

Cast
 Ralph Lynn as Hugo Carmody
 Winifred Shotter as Millicent Keeble
 Chili Bouchier as Sue Brown
 Horace Hodges as Lord Emsworth
 Helen Ferrers as Lady Emsworth
 Esme Percy as Baxter
 Miles Malleson as Beach
 Gordon James as Pillbeam
 Joe Monkhouse as Pigman

References

External links

1933 films
1933 comedy films
British comedy films
Films based on works by P. G. Wodehouse
British black-and-white films
British and Dominions Studios films
Films shot at Imperial Studios, Elstree
Films directed by Maclean Rogers
1930s English-language films
1930s British films